DWTV may refer to:

DW-TV, television channels by Deutsche Welle
DreamWorks Television, a television distribution and production company